Sentimental Education is an album by the New Zealand group Sneaky Feelings. First released as an LP in 1986, it was re-released with extra tracks as a CD the following year. Several of the extra tracks had previously been released as singles, including the band's biggest single, "'Husband House".

Critical reception
Perfect Sound Forever wrote that Sentimental Education "was more ambitious [than the debut], but faltered in places due to misguided production."

Track listing
Tracks marked with an asterisk were not on the original vinyl release.

Side A
All You've Done  2:37   
I'm Not Going To Let Her Bring Me Down  3:04   
Walk To The Square  3:14   
Now  2:13   
A Letter To You  4:04   
Broken Man  4:58   
Side B
It's So Easy  3:24   
Trouble With Kay  1:58   
Backroom  4:20   
Coming True  3:22   
Amnesia  3:51

Bonus tracks on European version (Flying Nun Europe – FNE 14CD - 1986).
Wasted Time
Wouldn't Cry*
Major Barbara*
Husband House*
The Strange and Conflicting Feelings of Separation and Betrayal*
Strangers Again*
Better Than Before*

Notes
The version of "Backroom" released on this album is a completely different recording to that which had earlier been on the Dunedin Double EP. The version of "Amnesia" is also a different version to the original release of the song (as the B-side of the "Be My Friend" single).

Personnel
Martin Durrant - vocals, drums, organ, piano, vibraphone, midi controller (DMX), percussion
David Pine - vocals, guitar, bass guitar
John Kelcher - vocals, guitar, bass guitar, organ
Matthew Bannister - vocals, guitar, organ, piano

References

1986 albums
Sneaky Feelings albums
Flying Nun Records albums